The 25th Separate Airborne Sicheslav Brigade is an airborne formation of the Ukrainian Air Assault Forces.

It is the only airborne unit of Ukrainian Air Assault Forces which has BMD-1 and BMD-2 airborne infantry fighting vehicles in its inventory. In addition, it is  the only unit which can be dropped anywhere by parachute, together with their armored vehicles, from Il-76MD and An-70 aircraft.

History
Between June 25 and August 11, 1969, the 217th Guards Airborne Regiment (Base #11389 [Military Unit No.11389?]) of the 98th Guards Airborne Division of the Soviet Airborne Forces was relocated to Bolhrad (Bolgrad), Odessa Oblast.

After the dissolution of the USSR, the 98th Guards Airborne Division was split between Ukraine and the Russian Federation. In the spring of 1993, the 217th Guards Airborne Regiment was relocated to Ivanovo in Russia. The regiment's Battle Flag, Order of Kutuzov, and 55% of the supplies were also relocated.

Current unit
By the order of Minister of Defence of Ukraine the new Ukrainian airmobile brigade based on the elements of the  Soviet 217th Guards  Airborne Regiment was formed in Bolgrad in May 1993. By December 1, 1993, the brigade was finally formed as one of the units of the 1st Airmobile Division.

From October 1995 until December 1999, 800 paratroopers from the brigade served as part of the 240th Special Battalion in former Yugoslavia. Later they served as peacekeepers in Kosovo.

Between May and June 2002, the Brigade was relocated to the urban-type settlement Hvardiyske, Dnipropetrovsk Oblast. The brigade was given the honorable designation "Dnipropetrovsk", for their battle achievements and high level of professionalism. On July 16, 2002, Leonid Kuchma awarded the unit with its new Battle Flag.

By the order of the Minister of Defence the Brigade was transferred from the 1st Airmobile Division to the 6th Army Corps on November 8, 2002.

On the occasion of the 30th Independence Day of Ukraine Ukrainian President Volodymyr Zelensky renamed the unit from 25th Separate Dnipropetrovsk Airborne Brigade to its current name.

Combat operations

War in Donbass

On June 13, 2014, an IL-76 Transport was shot down killing forty 25th Airborne Brigade troopers near Luhansk, Ukraine. “On the night of June 13–14, firing from an anti-aircraft gun and a large-caliber machine gun, anti-regime forces cynically and treacherously shot down a Ukraine armed forces transport plane IL-76 which was bringing personnel for rotation,” said in a statement posted on the Defense Ministry's official website.

A company of the brigade was deployed to Crimea during the 2014 Crimean crisis. It became one of the few, if not the only, Ukrainian unit to leave Crimea as a unit, still bearing their arms.

Two of its IFVs were captured by rebels during the War in Donbas. One of the vehicles was a BMD-1 and the other a BMD-2. Both are now used by the separatists. A 2S9 Nona-S was also captured by rebel forces. After elements surrendered 6 vehicles to pro-Russian separatists in the 2014 Sloviansk standoff, Acting President Oleksandr Turchynov announced the brigade would be disbanded, however this decision was later canceled.  The brigade has taken an active role in the fighting in Eastern Ukraine.

2022 Russian invasion of Ukraine
The unit takes part in combat in the 2022 Russian invasion of Ukraine. On March 15, 2022, a video was released showing a Russian tank being destroyed by the brigade. On March 18, 2022, the brigade released more photos of destroyed Russian T-72s.

In September 2022, the brigade was seen reaching the outskirts of Kupiansk alongside SBU Alpha Group, 92nd Mechanized Brigade, and the 80th Air Assault Brigade. That same day, the Kyiv Post announced the liberation of the city, despite the Ukrainian Armed Forces operational silence.   The UK Ministry of Defence commented, suggesting that the capture of the city dealt a "significant blow" due to Russian supply nodes routing to the Donbas region.

Structure 
As of 2022, the brigade's structure is as follows:

 25th Airborne Brigade, Hvardiiske
 Headquarters & Headquarters Company
 1st Battalion
 2nd Battalion
 3rd Battalion
 Tank Company (The tank company of 25th Airborne Brigade, equipped with T-80BV tanks).
 Reconnaissance Company
 Artillery Group
 Anti-Aircraft Company
 Engineer Company
 Maintenance Company
 CBRN Protection Company
 Logistic Company
 Material Support Company
 Medical Company
 Communication Company
 Proving Grounds
 Brigade Band

Past commanders
 Colonel Ivan Volodymyrovych Aleshchenko 1993 - 1996
 Colonel Oleksandr Mykolaiovych Zashchytnikov 1996 - 1998
 Lieutenant Colonel Yuriy Anatoliovych Garbus 1998 - 1999
 Colonel Andriy Ivanovych Maksymenko 1999 - 2001
 Colonel Ihor Vasyliovych Luniov 2001 - 2003
 Colonel Ihor Yaroslavovych Stelmah 2003 - 2004
 Lieutenant Colonel Volodymyr Vasyliovych Kolchik 2004 - 2006
 Colonel Oleh Volodymyrovych Svystak 2006 - 2007
 Colonel Yuriy Ivanovych Sodol' 2007–present

Traditions 
On July 16, 2002, the brigade was awarded the honorary name "Dnipropetrovsk".

On August 23, 2021, in accordance with the Decree of the President of Ukraine No. 414/2021 of August 23, 2021, the brigade was assigned the honorary name "Sycheslavska", and the Decree of the President of Ukraine of July 16, 2002 No. 654 "On assigning the honorary name "Dnipropetrovsk" to 25 separate airborne units brigade of the Ground Forces of the Armed Forces of Ukraine" — recognized as having lost its validity.

On October 14, 2021, in Zaporizhzhia on the island of Khortytsia, during the visit of the President of Ukraine Volodymyr Zelenskyi, brigade commander Colonel Yevhen Kurash received a battle flag with a ribbon with an honorary name.

On June 28, 2022, the brigade was awarded the honorary award "For Courage and Courage".

Valery Ananiev, a soldier of the brigade, wrote the fiction book Footprints on the Road, which, among other things, described Valery's service in the brigade before the beginning of the Russian-Ukrainian war and his experience and combat path after it began.

References

External links

 Official website for the Brigade
 Unofficial website of the Brigade
 History of the Brigade
 Patches

Brigades of the Ukrainian Air Assault Forces
Airborne infantry brigades
Military units and formations established in 1993
1993 establishments in Ukraine
Military units and formations of the 2022 Russian invasion of Ukraine
Military units and formations of Ukraine in the war in Donbas